Mohamed Ehuttar Hadjiar Maharoof (5 January 1939 – 20 July 1997) was a Sri Lankan politician and Member of Parliament.

Early life and family
Maharoof was born on 5 January 1939. His father was chairman of Kinniya Village Council and his brother was M. E. H. Mohamed Ali. He was educated at Zahira College, Matale, Trincomalee Hindu College, St. Anthony's College, Kandy and Pembroke Academy, Colombo.

Maharoof's son Imran is a provincial councillor and Member of Parliament.

Career
Maharoof gave up his studies and entered politics in 1965 following the unexpected death of his father. He was chairman of Kinniya Town Council from 1966 to 1971.

Maharoof stood as the United National Party (UNP) candidate in Mutur at the 1977 parliamentary election. He won the election and entered Parliament. He was appointed District Minister for Mannar in 1978. Maharoof contested the 1989 parliamentary election as one of the UNP's candidates in Trincomalee District. He was elected and re-entered Parliament. He was appointed Minister of State for Ports and Shipping in 1990. He was re-elected at the 1994 parliamentary election.

Maharoof had good relationship with Tamils in Trincomalee District and had opposed the establishment of the Sri Lanka Muslim Congress and a South Eastern Provincial Council for the Muslims. On the morning of 20 July 1997 Maharoof was travelling to Irakakkandy along the Kuchchaveli Road when his jeep was ambushed by gunmen at the 6th Mile Post between Trincomalee and Nilaveli. Maharoof and five others (the driver, a bodyguard, a colleague, a school principal and the driver's four-year-old son) were killed. The militant Liberation Tigers of Tamil Eelam was widely blamed for the assassination.

References

1939 births
1997 deaths
Alumni of R. K. M. Sri Koneswara Hindu College
Alumni of St. Anthony's College, Kandy
Alumni of Zahira College, Matale
Assassinated Sri Lankan politicians
District ministers of Sri Lanka
Local authority councillors of Sri Lanka
Members of the 8th Parliament of Sri Lanka
Members of the 9th Parliament of Sri Lanka
Members of the 10th Parliament of Sri Lanka
Ministers of state of Sri Lanka
People from Eastern Province, Sri Lanka
People killed during the Sri Lankan Civil War
People from British Ceylon
Sri Lankan Moor politicians
Sri Lankan Muslims
Sri Lankan terrorism victims
Terrorism deaths in Sri Lanka
United National Party politicians